Compiled from Australian Faunal Directory, IRMNG, GBIF, and Insects of the World. (Species from GBIF include species which are not accepted.)

a = AFD, i=IRMNG, g=GBIF, w=Insecta.

References

Platygastridae
Lists of Hymenoptera